William Bill (c. 1505 – 15 July 1561) was Master of St John's College, Cambridge (1547–1551?), Vice-Chancellor of the University of Cambridge (1548) and twice Master of Trinity College, Cambridge (1551–1553, 1558–1561), Provost of Eton College (1558–1561) and Dean of Westminster (1560–1561).

He was born to John and Margaret Bill of Ashwell, Hertfordshire. He had two brothers and two sisters. His brother Thomas became physician to Henry VIII of England. William was educated at St John's College, Cambridge, gaining his BA in 1532. He was elected a Fellow of St John's College in 1535, and gained his MA in 1546. He received a BD degree during the period 1544–1546. In 1547, he was elected Master of St John's College, and also became a Doctor of Divinity. In 1551, he was appointed Master of Trinity College. Following the accession of Mary I in 1553, he lost all his former positions. John Christopherson was appointed in his stead to the Mastership of Trinity. When Elizabeth I of England acceded in 1558, he was appointed Provost of Eton College, and re-appointed as Master of Trinity College. He was Lord High Almoner from 1558 to 1561 and helped revise the liturgy of Edward VI. He was appointed Dean of Westminster on 30 June 1560 but died the following year. He was buried in St Benedict's Chapel, Westminster Abbey, where his tomb and small brass figure can still be seen.

References

External links
The Master of Trinity at Trinity College, Cambridge

1500s births
1561 deaths

Year of birth uncertain
Alumni of St John's College, Cambridge
Fellows of St John's College, Cambridge
Masters of St John's College, Cambridge
Masters of Trinity College, Cambridge
Deans of Westminster
Burials at Westminster Abbey
16th-century English Anglican priests
Vice-Chancellors of the University of Cambridge
People from Ashwell, Hertfordshire
Provosts of Eton College